The Batang (Chinese: , p Batánghé) or Ba Chu (Chinese: , p Baqū; Tibetan: , w Dpal Chu, z Bä Qu) is an  long river in Sichuan province in the People's Republic of China. It is located near Batang town, not the Batang township near Gyêgu in Qinghai.

The Batang is a tributary of the Yangtze river system. The main course of the river is the Jinsha, into which the Batang empties.

References

Rivers of Sichuan